The Mezenskaya Pizhma is a river in Ust-Tsilemsky District of the Komi Republic and in Leshukonsky District of Arkhangelsk Oblast in Russia. It is a right tributary of the Mezen. The major tributaries of the Mezenskaya Pizhma are the Chetlas and the Shegmas (both left).

The Mezenskaya Pizhma starts in the Komi Republic, west of Lake Yamozero, close to the border with Arkhangelsk Oblast, on the Chatlassky Kamen Plateau, part of the Timan Ridge. It generally flows in the western direction. The Pizhma, flowing out of Lake Yamozero, runs to the east in the Pechora, and the name Mezenskaya Pizhma means literally "The Pizhma which belongs to the Mezen". 

The river flows in one of the most remote areas of Arkhangelsk Oblast. The upper course of the Mezenskaya Pizhma is not populated, and in the whole valley of the river there are only three villages: Shegmas, upstream from the confluence of the Shegmas River, Larkino, and Rodoma in the mouth.

References

External links

Rivers of the Komi Republic
Rivers of Arkhangelsk Oblast